It Won't Be Soon Before Long is the second studio album by American pop rock band Maroon 5. It was released on May 16, 2007, by A&M Octone Records, as the follow-up to their debut album, Songs About Jane (2002). The name was inspired by a phrase the band adopted to keep themselves motivated while on their tour.

The album debuted at number one on the U.S. Billboard 200, selling around 430,000 copies in its first week. It is the first to feature drummer Matt Flynn. The band's former drummer, percussionist and background vocalist – Ryan Dusick, who officially left the band in 2006, due to serious wrist and shoulder injuries, was credited as the "Musical Director".<ref>[ Credits: It Won't Be Soon Before Long"]. Allmusic. Retrieved on 2010-06-13.</ref>

Background
During the recording sessions for It Won't Be Soon Before Long, the band not only recorded the 12 songs on the album, but also an additional 7 tracks. The extra songs were featured as B-sides to the album's singles, and later on The B-Side Collection. The band stated in interviews that the album has a different feel to it from their 2002 debut album Songs About Jane. The songs are not all based on one specific relationship, as in Jane, and also have a different sound than their first album, being more electric and drawing inspiration from such artists as Talking Heads, Michael Jackson and Prince. Guitarist James Valentine stated that the goal was to make the songs sound more "up-tempo" than the ones on their previous record. A review written prior to the album's release described the songs as having a very retro feel. Adam Levine explained that this record is a little more self-confident and powerful lyrically: "...you can dance to it, there's a little more attitude."

According to Levine, working with other artists had influences on the album: "Kanye West and Alicia Keys are amazing talents, in totally different ways. Just seeing such amazing people working in the studio. I definitely took things away from them."

The chorus of "Nothing Lasts Forever" is the same as the one used in the Kanye West single "Heard 'Em Say", which features Adam Levine, with exclusion to the line: "...the distance between us makes it so hard to stay...".

Commercial receptionIt Won't Be Soon Before Long debuted at number one on the US Billboard 200 albums chart, selling 429,000 copies in its first week of release. It Won't Be Soon Before Long sold 102,000 copies digitally, breaking a record set last week when Linkin Park's Minutes to Midnight (Machine Shop/Warner Bros.) moved 84,000 via that format to debut at No. 1. The latter album slips to No. 2 this week with 198,000, a 68% sales decline. In December 2007, the album ranked number one for iTunes top best selling albums of 2007.

In the UK, it became their second album to reach the number one spot, but their first to debut atop the UK Albums Chart. In Australia, peaked at number five, lower than their first studio album Songs About Jane which peaked at number one in 2004. It peaked at number two on the Canadian Albums Chart and New Zealand. At number three in Ireland, Japan and Mexico, at number five in Australia and Taiwan, and number six in Italy, Spain and Switzerland.It Won't Be Soon Before Long was certified Gold in Ireland, Italy and New Zealand, platinum in Australia, Canada, Japan and the UK. 2× Platinum in the US, and 3× Platinum in South Korea. It was certified Diamond in Colombia and Mexico.

Critical reception

Initial critical response to It Won't Be Soon Before Long was positive. At Metacritic, which assigns a normalized rating out of 100 to reviews from mainstream critics, the album has received an average score of 66, based on 14 reviews.

AllMusic rated the album 4.5 stars out of 5, commenting that the production of the album "is so immaculate that it glistens". Billboard rated it 4.5 stars. This album was #32 on Rolling Stones list of the Top 50 Albums of 2007.

 Songs 

Singles

"Makes Me Wonder" was released as the lead single from the album on March 27, 2007. It became the band's first number-one on the Billboard Hot 100 and Billboard Dance Club Songs charts. The song won the Grammy Award for Best Pop Performance by a Duo or Group with Vocal at the 50th Grammy Awards, their second song to win the award. The song was among the most successful of 2007, and was their biggest hit until the release of "Moves like Jagger" by the band in 2011. It also reached number one in Canada and Hungary.

The second single, "Wake Up Call", was released on July 17, 2007. It peaked at number three in the Belgium region of Flanders, at number six in Canada, and eight in Italy. It became a top-twenty hit, peaking at number nineteen in Australia and the United States.

"Won't Go Home Without You" was released as the third single on November 19, 2007. It peaked at number 48 in the Billboard Hot 100. As of June 2014, the song has sold 1,647,000 copies in the US. The song became the first Maroon 5 single to fail to chart in the UK top 40, only peaking at number 44 on the UK Singles Chart.

The fourth and final single, "If I Never See Your Face Again" was re-recorded to feature singer Rihanna, and released digitally on May 2, 2008, to promote the June 2008 re-issue of the album, impacting mainstream radio stations on May 15, 2008. It achieved moderate chart success on singles charts around the world. In the United States, the song peaked at number 51 on the Billboard Hot 100 chart on July 26, 2008. It peaked at number 10 on the Adult Pop Songs chart; number 30 on the Pop Songs chart and 21 on the Hot Digital Songs chart. The song was nominated for Best Pop Collaboration with Vocals at the 51st Grammy Awards.

Promotional singles
"Can't Stop" was the album's first promotional single, released in 2007. It was the first song from the album performed live, being debuted during shows in early 2005. The song was later featured in CSI: NY, Moonlight and So You Think You Can Dance.

"Goodnight Goodnight" was released on August 21, 2008, as the album's second promotional single. A music video premiered on Yahoo! Music, the same day. It was directed by Marc Webb and featuring actress Candace Bailey, playing the love interest of Adam Levine. The video is based on a "before and after" story which leads Levine and Bailey to a beautiful love story. The song appeared on The CW's fall 2008 advertisement. The band also performed the song in the television series CSI: NY, where they guest star in the episode "Page Turner".

Other songs
"Nothing Lasts Forever" charted at number 23 on the Billboard Bubbling Under Hot 100 chart. It is featured on the television series The Hills and a promo of the 2008 film Definitely, Maybe.

Track listing

Korean/Australian Limited Deluxe Edition

ReissueIt Won't Be Soon Before Long'' was reissued in expanded form on June 29, 2008, in Australia and July 8, 2008, for the rest of the world via A&M/Octone. The package included a bonus DVD with four music videos and a full concert recorded on June 13, 2007, in Montreal, Quebec, Canada. The reissue contained the original 12 tracks plus five B-sides: "Infatuation", "Miss You Love You", "Until You're Over Me", "Story" and "Losing My Mind". Also added onto the track list is "If I Never See Your Face Again", Maroon 5's then-newest single featuring Rihanna. The Australian and UK versions included one more track, a remix of "Wake Up Call" by Mark Ronson featuring Mary J. Blige.

In Australia, the CD was only available as the "Special Edition", and the DVD was not included as the Limited Edition featured a DVD. The UK version also does not include the DVD.

CD
 Standard 12 tracks

DVD

Sample credit
 "Nothing Lasts Forever" contains an interpolation of the 2005 song "Heard 'Em Say" by Kanye West featuring Adam Levine.
 "Goodnight Goodnight" contains an interpolation of the 2000 song "Kryptonite" by 3 Doors Down.

Credits and personnel 
All credits adapted from the album liner notes.
Maroon 5
 Adam Levine – lead and backing vocals, rhythm and lead guitars, drums (track 11)
 Jesse Carmichael – keyboards, slide guitar (track 11), backing vocals
 Mickey Madden – bass guitar (all tracks except 11)
 James Valentine – lead and rhythm guitars, backing vocals
 Matt Flynn – drums (all tracks except 11), percussion
 Ryan Dusick – musical director
Session Musicians
 Lenny Castro – percussion (tracks 1-2 & 10)
 Matt Teal – additional keyboards (track 4)
 Adam MacDougall – additional keyboards (track 7)
 Rashida Jones – additional vocals (track 10)
 Bill Reichenbach – horns (track 10)
 Dan Higgins – horns (track 10)
 Gary Grant – horns (track 10)
 Jerry Hey – horns (track 10)
 David Campbell – strings, horns (arrangement and conducting) (track 12)
 Rihanna – guest vocals (track 13 on reissue)

Production
 Mike Elizondo – production (tracks 1, 4-6, & 8-11), bass and additional piano (track 11), additional guitar (5), additional keyboards (1, 6 & 9)
 Mark "Spike" Stent - production (tracks 1, 4-6, & 8-11)
 Mark Endert – production (tracks 2 & 12), co-production (track 4), additional keyboards (tracks 1-2 & 4), audio mixing (1-2 & 4), recording engineer (1-2 & 4), music arranger (4), drum machine (1-2 & 4)
 Eric Valentine - production (tracks 3 & 7)
 Sam Farrar - production (track 4), additional arrangement (track 3), drum programming (track 4), additional keyboards (track 4)
 Adam Hawkins - Pro-Tools engineer (tracks 1, 4-6, 9 & 10) 
 David Emery - digital editing (track 1), mix assistant (tracks 5-6, 8-9 & 11)
 Alex Dromgoole - mix assistant (tracks 5-6, 8-9 & 11)
 Len Peltier - art direction and design
 Andrew Zuckerman - cover photography
 Wendy Sue Lamm - Booklet Photography
 Ben Berkman - A&R
 Melinda Kelly - video commissioner

Charts

Weekly charts

Year-end charts

Certifications

Release history

Standard edition

Re-issue

References

External links
 

2007 albums
Maroon 5 albums
A&M Octone Records albums
Interscope Records albums
Interscope Geffen A&M Records albums
Albums produced by Eric Valentine
Albums produced by Mark Endert
Albums produced by Mike Elizondo
Albums produced by Sam Farrar
Albums produced by Spike Stent
Albums recorded at Sunset Sound Recorders
Albums recorded at The Mansion (recording studio)